The Ottawa Jail Hostel is a hostel operated by Saintlo Hostels and located at 75 Nicholas Street in Ottawa, Ontario, Canada. The hostel was originally the Carleton County Gaol (jail), more commonly known as the Nicholas Street Gaol or Ottawa Jail. When the jail closed in 1972, Hostelling International purchased and converted the building, but left much of the structure intact, allowing guests to experience spending a night "in jail". The top floor, which had served as the jail's death row, has been restored to much of its original condition and daily tours are conducted.

In 2009, the hostel's bar, Mugshots, was opened to the public. In July 2011, the courtyard space of the former jail was converted into an outdoor bar for the summer months.

As of April 1, 2022 the hostel is no longer affiliated with Hostelling International. The hostel intends to reopen in April 2023 under Saintlo Hostels.

History

The Nicholas Street Gaol was the main jail of Ottawa for over a century. The structure was built in 1862 next door to the courthouse, and connected by a tunnel. Designed by Henry Horsey, the jail was the site of the hanging of Patrick J. Whelan on February 11, 1869, for the assassination of Thomas D'Arcy McGee. Over 5,000 people witnessed Whelan's hanging, which was a large number considering the size of Ottawa at the time. Staff and guests have reported that Whelan's spirit is one of many that haunts the hostel and will appear at the end of guests' beds or in his death-row cell. The third (official) and final execution at the jail took place on March 27, 1946, when Eugène Larment, who had killed an Ottawa police detective, was hanged. The building remained in use as a jail until 1972 when the outdated facility was closed. The original gallows, however, are intact and remain fully functional. While open, the jail inflicted very inhumane conditions upon those imprisoned there and modern day excavations of the property have revealed numerous unmarked graves. Up to 150 prisoners, consisting of men, women, and children, would be forced to share 60 small cells (1x3 meters) and 30 larger cells (2x3 meters); as well as six solitary confinement units. Inmates included murderers, the mentally ill, or those incarcerated for minor infractions such as drunk and disorderly conduct.

Television
The hostel was featured in the third episode of the Canadian television show The Girly Ghosthunters that aired on Space in 2005. It was also featured on the second episode of the Canadian television show Mystery Hunters in 2002.

See also
 List of designated heritage properties in Ottawa

Notes

External links
 
 Ottawa Jail Hostel in photos

1973 establishments in Ontario
Hostels in Canada
Hotels in Ottawa
Defunct prisons in Ontario
Execution sites
Reportedly haunted locations in Ottawa